Hampshire County Cricket Club was formed in 1864, and first appeared in the County Championship in 1895.  They played their first List A match in the 1963 Gillette Cup against Derbyshire.  The players in this list have all played at least one List A match for Hampshire.  Hampshire cricketers who have not represented the county in List A cricket are excluded from the list. Hampshire play their matches at the Rose Bowl (also known as the Ageas Bowl)

Players are listed in order of appearance, where players made their debut in the same match, they are ordered by batting order.  Players in bold have played only List A cricket for Hampshire.

Key

List of players

See also
 Hampshire County Cricket Club
 List of Hampshire County Cricket Club first-class players
 List of Hampshire County Cricket Club Twenty20 players
 List of international cricketers from Hampshire

References

LIst A